A Flower is a song for voice and closed piano by John Cage. It was composed in 1950, for a choreography by Louise Lippold, wife of sculptor Richard Lippold. There is no text; the singer vocalises a small number of phonemes such as "uh", "wah", etc., without vibrato. Instructions given in the score include, for some passages, "like a pigeon" and "like a wild duck". The entire vocal line is constructed of just four pitches, except for a single bar near the end where a fifth pitch is used. The pianist plays by hitting the piano lid in various ways - with his fingers, with his knuckles, etc. The composition is somewhat similar to the earlier work for voice and closed piano, The Wonderful Widow of Eighteen Springs.

Editions 
 Edition Peters 6711. (c) 1960 by Henmar Press.

See also 
 List of compositions by John Cage
 Nowth upon Nacht

Compositions by John Cage
1950 compositions